John Waugh (born 1889) was a Scottish footballer who played mainly as an inside right for clubs including Heart of Midlothian (where he was a teenage reserve behind Bobby Walker), Ayr Parkhouse, Hamilton Academical, Raith Rovers and Motherwell. He played for Hamilton in the 1911 Scottish Cup Final, lost to Celtic after a replay.

References

1889 births
20th-century deaths
Place of death missing
Date of death unknown
Scottish footballers
Hamilton Academical F.C. players
Footballers from North Lanarkshire
Dykehead F.C. players
Motherwell F.C. players
Raith Rovers F.C. players
Ayr Parkhouse F.C. players
Heart of Midlothian F.C. players
Scottish Football League players
Sportspeople from Shotts
Association football inside forwards